Hoven Droven is a Swedish folk rock band founded in 1989. They specialize in instrumental, hard rock arrangements of old Swedish folk tunes.  The closest English translation of the Jamtish phrase "Hoven Droven" is "helter skelter" or "whatever."

Their 2006 album "Jumping at the Cedar" was nominated at the Swedish awards Grammis in the folk music category. Their music is distributed in the United States by the NorthSide label.

Band members

Current members
 Pedro Blom, bass
 Jens Comén, saxophones
 Kjell-Erik Eriksson, violin
 Björn Höglund drums, percussion
 Bosse "Bo" Lindberg, guitar

Former members
 Gustav Hylén, trumpet, flugelhorn
 Janne Strömstedt, keyboards

Guest musicians
 Ulrika Bodén, vocals
 Sofia Sandén, vocals
 André Ferrari, drums

Discography

1994 Hia-Hia (Xource/MNW (Sweden) XOUCD 110)
1996 Grov (Xource/MNW (Sweden) XOUCD 114)
1997 Groove (compilation from Hia Hia and Grov plus two live tracks, NorthSide (U.S.) NSD 6002)
1999 More Happy Moments with Hoven Droven (Home (Sweden) 013, NorthSide (U.S.) NSD 6043)
2001 Hippa (Home (Sweden) 020, NorthSide (U.S.) NSD 6062)
2004 Turbo (Home (Sweden) 032)
2006 Jumping at the Cedar (2-CD live compilation, Home (Sweden) 044, NorthSide (U.S.) NSD 6090)
2011 Rost (2011, Westpark, PGM-87217)

References

External links
Hoven Droven

Video
TVfolk.net (search under "Sweden")

Swedish folk rock groups
Westpark Music artists